"Guilty" is a single by musician Mike Oldfield, released in 1979 on Virgin Records. It reached number 22 in the UK Singles Chart. It is notable for being Oldfield's first obvious attempt to capitalise on a current musical trend, in this case disco/dance music. The UK 12" edition was originally issued on pale blue vinyl.

Recording 
The composition came from Oldfield's desire to create an up-tempo tune based on a more interesting chord structure than what was typical to disco music; it is built on the circle of fifths chord previously used as the leitmotif of the musician's album Incantations. When Oldfield was in New York recording Platinum and "Guilty" he recorded a disco arrangement of his first album, Tubular Bells.  A version of Free's "All Right Now" was also recorded during these sessions.

Music video 
The music video for "Guilty" is in a colourful cartoon style. A promo video for "Guilty 2013" was released by earMusic, which features a shortened version of the "Guilty Electrofunk Mix" from the Oldfield/York remix album Tubular Beats. In 2011 Moist Creations had released a screenshot from this titled "Guilty 2011".

Track listing

7" single 
 "Guilty" Mike Oldfield – 4:00
 "Excerpt from Incantations" Mike Oldfield – 4:10

12" super giant 45 
 "Guilty (Long version)" Mike Oldfield – 6:44
 "Guilty" Mike Oldfield – 4:02

Personnel
 Mike Oldfield - guitar, producer
 Kurt Munkacsi - engineer
 Roddy Hui - assistant engineer
 Chris Parker - drums
 Garry Guzio - horn
 Dana McCurdy - synthesiser
 David Tofani - sax
 Raymond L. Chew - piano
 Neil Jason - bass
 Steve Winwood - organ
 Iris Hiskey - vocals
 Patricia Deckert - vocals
 David Anchel - vocals
 Phil Gavin Smith - vocals
 Christa Peters - photography
 Cooke Key - sleeve

Charts

References 

1979 singles
Mike Oldfield songs
Songs written by Mike Oldfield
Virgin Records singles